Murrays Flats was a railway station on the Main South railway line in New South Wales, Australia. It opened in 1888 and closed to passenger services in 1975.

War time storage of surplus wheat was organised with multiple sidings being built on the north side of Murrays Flats and on the south side of the line west of Yarra south west Goulburn. Both sets of sidings were removed after better storage solutions were built using silos.

Murrays Flats station was later demolished and no trace of the station now survives.

References

Railway stations in Australia opened in 1888
Railway stations closed in 1975
Disused regional railway stations in New South Wales
Main Southern railway line, New South Wales